Jada Ferguson (born 8 July 2002) is an Australian rugby league footballer who plays as a  or  for the Brisbane Broncos in the NRL Women's Premiership and Tweed Heads Seagulls in the QRL Women's Premiership.

Background
Born in Toowoomba, Queensland, Ferguson began playing rugby league at age 11 but was forced to stop due to age restrictions, instead switching to touch football and rugby sevens. She is cousins with Brisbane Broncos teammate Shenae Ciesiolka.

Playing career
In 2021, Ferguson joined the Tweed Heads Seagulls in the QRL Women's Premiership. In June 2021, she played five-eighth for Queensland Under-19 in their loss to New South Wales Under-19 at Sunshine Coast Stadium. 

In December 2021, Ferguson signed with the Brisbane Broncos for the rescheduled 2021 NRL Women's Premiership season.

In Round 1 of the 2021 NRL Women's season, she made her debut for the Broncos, coming off the bench in a win over the Sydney Roosters.

References

External links
Brisbane Broncos profile

2002 births
Living people
People from Toowoomba
Australian female rugby league players
Rugby league five-eighths
Brisbane Broncos (NRLW) players